Trichopterna is a genus of sheet weavers that was first described by C. Chyzer & Władysław Kulczyński in 1894.

Species
 it contains nine species, found only in Africa, Asia, and Europe:
Trichopterna cito (O. Pickard-Cambridge, 1873) (type) – Europe, Turkey, Caucasus, Russia (Europe to South Siberia), Kazakhstan
Trichopterna cucurbitina (Simon, 1881) – Portugal, Spain, France
Trichopterna grummi Tanasevitch, 1989 – Central Asia
Trichopterna krueperi (Simon, 1885) – Greece
Trichopterna loricata Denis, 1962 – Tanzania
Trichopterna lucasi (O. Pickard-Cambridge, 1875) – Algeria
Trichopterna macrophthalma Denis, 1962 – Tanzania
Trichopterna rotundiceps Denis, 1962 – Tanzania
Trichopterna seculifera Denis, 1962 – Tanzania

See also
 List of Linyphiidae species (Q–Z)

References

Araneomorphae genera
Linyphiidae
Spiders of Africa
Spiders of Asia